University of Connecticut School of Engineering is a school of engineering located at UConn's main campus in Storrs, Connecticut. Established in 1916, the school is often placed highly in national rankings, and is recognized as a national leader in closing the gender gap prevalent in undergraduate engineering

Academics 
University of Connecticut School of Engineering include following departments:
 Biomedical Engineering
 Chemical & Biomolecular Engineering 
 Materials Science & Engineering
 Civil & Environmental Engineering
 Computer Science & Engineering
 Electrical & Computer Engineering
 Materials Science & Engineering
 Mechanical Engineering

Graduate programs 
UConn Engineering offers M.S and Ph.D. degree programs including Biomedical Engineering, Chemical Engineering, Civil Engineering, Computer Science and Engineering, Electrical Engineering, Environmental Engineering, Material Science and Engineering, Mechanical Engineering, Polymer Science, Master of Engineering (MENG) and graduate-level Advanced Engineering Certificates.

Master of Engineering offerings include 30-credit, 10 course online concentrations with synchronous and asynchronous coursework in:

 Advanced Manufacturing for Energy Systems
 Advanced Systems Engineering
 Civil Engineering
 Clinical Engineering
 Computer Science and Engineering
 Data Science
 Electrical and Computer Engineering
 Environmental Engineering
 General Engineering
 Manufacturing
 Materials Science and Engineering
 MBA/Master of Engineering Dual Degree
 Mechanical Engineering

Advanced Engineering Certificates are 12-credit, 4 course online certificates with synchronous and asynchronous grad-level coursework that can be parlayed into a full Master of Engineering degree. Offerings include:

 Advanced Materials Characterization
 Advanced Systems Engineering
 Bridge Engineering
 Composites Engineering
 Contaminate Site Remediation
 Engineering Data Science
 Power Engineering
 Power Grid Modernization
 Process Engineering

References 

Educational institutions established in 1916
1916 establishments in Connecticut